Nor Kokhp (also, Nor-Kokhb) is a town in the Yerevan region of Armenia.

References 

Populated places in Yerevan